This is an alphabetical list of women playwrights who were active in England and Wales, and the Kingdom of Great Britain and Ireland before approximately 1800, with a brief indication of productivity. (For a chronological list, see the link on the right.) Nota Bene: Authors of dramatic works are the focus of this list, though many of these writers worked in more than one genre.

Playwrights
Ariadne (fl. 1694-95): pseudonym of unknown author of She Ventures and He Wins
Penelope Aubin (c. 1679 – c. 1731): primarily a novelist; one play produced
Joanna Baillie (1762–1851): prolific playwright
Maria Barrell née Weylar (died 1803): born in West Indies; poet, playwright, and writer for periodicals
Elizabeth Barrett Browning (1806–1861): primarily a poet; one closet drama and one translation
Aphra Behn (1640–1689): usually credited with being the first female professional playwright in English
Frances Boothby (fl. 1669–1670): author of the first original play by a woman to be produced in London
Rachel Bourchier (Countess of Bath, née Fane; 1613–1680): wrote masques
Mary Bowes (1749–1800): published one play
Elizabeth Boyd (c. 1710 – 1745): one play; wrote primarily in other genres
Barbarina Brand (1768–1854): author of four published plays, one produced
Hannah Brand (1754–1821): published playwright
Frances Brooke (1723–1789): primarily a novelist; wrote comic opera
Frances Burney (1752–1840): primarily a novelist; author of several plays, only one produced in her lifetime
Frances Burney (1776–1828): published two unproduced tragedies
Sophia Burrell (1753–1802): author of two tragedies
Christian Carstairs (fl. 1763—1786): poet who wrote a short theatrical
Elizabeth Cary (née Tanfield; 1585–1639): first woman known to have written and published an original play in English
Jane Cavendish (1620/21–1669): co-authored a pastoral masque with her sister, Elizabeth Egerton
Margaret Cavendish (1623–1673): author of closet dramas
Dorothea Celesia (baptised 1738, d. 1790): translated Voltaire's Tancrède
Susannah Centlivre (c. 1667–1723): playwright
Charlotte Charke (1713–1760): playwright/actress/manager
Catherine Clive (1711–1785): actress; wrote farces with some success
Elizabeth Cooper (née Price) (1698? – 1761?): actress, playwright, and poet
Misses Corbett Sisters Walterina Cunningham (died 1837) and Grace Corbett (c. 1765 – 1843): novelists, playwrights, and anthologists
Hannah Cowley (1743–1809): playwright and poet
Elizabeth Craven (1750–1828): writer of farces and pantomimes
Catherine Crowe (1800–1876): primarily a fiction writer; two plays, one produced
Mary Davys (1674–1732): novelist; produced one play; had another published
Elizabeth Egerton (1626–1663): co-authored a pastoral masque with her sister, Jane Cavendish
Anne Finch (1661–1720): primarily a poet; author of verse dramas
Sarah Gardner (née Cheney; fl. 1763–1795): comedic actress and playwright
Catherine Gore (1799–1861): eleven plays produced
Elizabeth Griffith (c. 1727 – 1793): playwright
Eliza Haywood (1693–1756): playwright; wrote primarily in other genres
Felicia Hemans (1793–1835): primarily a poet; some verse drama
Margaret Holford(1757–1834): one play produced
Margaret Holford (1778–1852): one play, neither published nor produced
Elizabeth Inchbald (1753–1821): playwright
Mary Latter (1725–1777): one tragedy produced
Harriet Lee (1757–1851): playwright
Sophia Lee (1750–1824): playwright
Charlotte Lennox (née Ramsay; c. 1730 – 1804): Scottish novelist, playwright and poet
Jane Lumley (1537–1578): first translator of Euripides into English
Delarivier Manley (1663 or c. 1670–1724): playwright
Jean Marishall (Jane Marshall) (fl. 1765–1788): one play
Mary Russell Mitford (1787–1855): playwright
Hannah More (1745–1833): playwright; published in many genres
Katherine Philips (1631–1664): mainly a poet; author of two plays (one unfinished)
Mary Pix (1666–1709): playwright
Anne Plumptre (1760–1818): wrote primarily in other genres; translated dramas
Elizabeth Polack (fl. 1830–1838): author of five plays, three surviving
Elizabeth Polwheele (c. 1651 – c. 1691): two plays extant
Jane Porter (1776–1850): two plays
Jael Pye (née Mendez) (c. 1737 – 1782): published four works, each in a different genre
Fanny Robertson (1765-1855): actor-manager, author of at least two plays
Mary Robinson (1757–1800): wrote primarily in other genres; one play produced
Anna Ross (b. 1773): performer; wrote comic opera
Susanna Rowson (née Haswell) (1762–1824): British-American novelist, poet, playwright
Jane Scott (1779–1839): theatre manager, actor, and playwright
Frances Sheridan (1724–1766): playwright
 Mary Sidney Herbert (1561–1621): translated one play
Charlotte Smith (1749–1806): novelist and poet; one comedy attributed to her
Mariana Starke (1761/2–1838): author of four plays, not all produced; mainly a travel writer
Katherine of Sutton (Abbess, 1358–1376): rewrote several mystery plays
Catherine Trotter (1679–1749): playwright
Eglantine Wallace (née Maxwell; died 1803): comedies and tragedy
Jane West (1758–1852): wrote primarily in other genres
Anne Wharton (née Lee; 1659-1685): poet and verse dramatist
Elizabeth Kemble (1761–1836): known for acting
Jane Wiseman (fl. c. 1682–1717): author of one produced play
Mary Wortley Montagu (c. 1689–1762): wrote primarily in other genres
Mary Wroth (1587–1652): primarily a poet; one drama extant
Ann Yearsley (c. 1753 – 1806): primarily a poet; produced and published one play
Elizabeth Yorke (née Lindsay; 1763-1858): playwright

See also
Women dramatists and playwrights
List of biographical dictionaries of women writers in English
List of early-modern British women novelists
List of early-modern British women poets
List of female poets
List of feminist poets
List of playwrights
List of playwrights by nationality and date of birth
List of women rhetoricians
List of women writers
Women Writers Project
Women's writing (literary category)

References 
Blain, Virginia, et al., eds. The Feminist Companion to Literature in English. New Haven and London: Yale UP, 1990. (Internet Archive)
Buck, Claire, ed.The Bloomsbury Guide to Women's Literature. Prentice Hall, 1992. (Internet Archive)
Chadwyck-Healey Database of English Prose Drama (through 1750) and (1750–1939)
Oxford Dictionary of National Biography. Oxford: OUP, 2004. 
Robertson, Fiona, ed. Women's Writing, 1778–1838. Oxford: OUP, 2001. (Internet Archive)
Schlueter, Paul, and June Schlueter. An encyclopedia of British women writers. Rutgers University Press, 1998. (Internet Archive)
Todd, Janet, ed. British Women Writers: a critical reference guide. London: Routledge, 1989. (Internet Archive)

External links 
Bibliography of Early Modern Women Writers That Are In Print
British Women Playwrights around 1800
The Brown University Women Writers Project
A Celebration of Women Writers
Emory Women Writers Resource Project
Images of Early Modern, 20th and 21st Century British Female Playwrights
List of biographical dictionaries, with a focus on 17thc women writers
London Theater People - 1660–1800
Luminarium
The Perdita Project
The Restoration Comedy Project
Romantic Circles
Women Romantic-Era Writers
The Women Writers Archive: Early Modern Women Writers Online

Women
 
 
Lists of women writers by format